Cold War is a 2012 Hong Kong police thriller film directed by Sunny Luk and Longman Leung, starring Aaron Kwok and Tony Leung Ka-fai, and guest starring Andy Lau. The film was selected as the opening film at the 17th Busan International Film Festival and released in Hong Kong, Macau, and mainland China on 8 November 2012.

The film's title, Cold War (寒戰), is derived from the code name used in the police operation where the plot of the film evolves.

The film won nine awards including Best Actor, Best Film, Best Director and Best Screenplay at the 32nd Hong Kong Film Awards.

The film has a sequel, known as Cold War 2.

Plot
One midnight, a Hong Kong Police Force Emergency Unit (EU) van carrying advanced equipment and five police officers goes missing. As the police investigate the case, they became aware that the terrorists possess detailed knowledge of the police's procedures and have planned several steps ahead, even possibly breaching the secured police network. As the Commissioner is away, Deputy Commissioner M.B. Lee (Tony Leung Ka-fai), plans and leads a rescue operation code-named "Cold War," and declares Hong Kong to go under a state of emergency.

After being repeatedly misled by the terrorists and failing to track them down, fellow Deputy Commissioner Sean Lau (Aaron Kwok) believes Lee is acting too rashly, due to one of the five abducted policemen being his own son, Joe Lee (Eddie Peng). After consulting with superintendent Vincent Tsui (Chin Kar-lok) and Albert Kwang (Gordon Lam), who both believe Lee is taking measures too extreme, Lau relieves Lee of his command and assumes command of Operation Cold War.

Lau plans to negotiate with the terrorists while secretly tracking them to their hide-out. The terrorists asks Lau to prepare a ransom equal to the calculated value of the policemen and the EU van. As the police force prepare the cash, the terrorists call again and say they only want roughly a third of the ransom, and for Lau to personally deliver the money. At the request of the bank manager, Lau takes only enough for the ransom and have the rest delivered back to the bank. When Lau eventually arrives at the meeting location, he is ordered to stop the car immediately and throw the cash down a bridge, causing a traffic blockage. In the confusion, Lau is attacked by the terrorists, and superintendent Tsui was killed in action in the crossfire. The terrorists escape, while superintendent Kwang notifies Lau that the terrorists simultaneously intercepted the rest of the money that was supposed to be returned to the bank. However, the police force did successfully rescue the missing policemen at a different location.

Lau attempts to question the bank manager, but the manager was then killed by a car bomb. Superintendent Kwang investigates the bombing to track the bombers, but is instead led into a trap and killed with his team. Lau suspects that the terrorists were aided by insiders in the force, but before he can investigate any further, he is arrested by ICAC Officer Billy Cheung (Aarif Rahman), who received leaked information from an anonymous source about Operation Cold War. Lau is interrogated by Cheung, who accuses him of poorly handling the rescue operation, leading to the loss of the ransom money which he secretly took for himself. Lau denies this, and the ICAC fail to find evidence against him. Cheung makes some further investigations and discovers that the police Commissioner will be stepping down in two years, and thus either Lee or Lau will receive a promotion. Lau has the support of the Security Secretary because of his skillful management of the police's finances. On the other hand, Lee rose through the ranks from Constable and has the support of the front-line officers including the CID. Cheung now suspects that Lee is trying to use the failure of Operation Cold War to ruin Lau's chance for promotion.

The ICAC eventually discover, based on forensic evidence, that Joe Lee was the mastermind behind the abduction of the EU van. Lau presents this information to Lee, and reveals that it was Lau himself that leaked information to the ICAC (who has the power to act independent to the police force), in order to borrow their resources to investigate the case, thus not alerting the insider. Lee confronts his son, who reveals that he planned this with other associates from the police force who wanted to see Lee rise to the position of Commissioner. Seeing that Joe is unrepentant and unwilling to reveal anymore, Lee reluctantly has him arrested while denouncing the latter as his son. The following day, Lee and the current Commissioner announce their plans to retire, nominates Lau as the next Commissioner, and congratulate Lau on his resourcefulness on solving the case.

The film ends with Lau receiving a mysterious phone call from the terrorists, who announces that they have kidnapped his wife, and wants Joe Lee released in return.

Cast
 Aaron Kwok as Sean K.F. Lau (劉傑輝), Deputy Commissioner of Police (Management)
 Tony Leung Ka-fai as Waise M.B. Lee (李文彬), Deputy Commissioner of Police (Operation), Acting Commissioner of Police during opening scene
 Andy Lau (guest star) as Philip M.W. Luk (陸明華), Security Bureau, Secretary for Security
 Charlie Young as Phoenix C.M. Leung (梁紫薇), Chief Superintendent, Head of Police Public Relations Branch
 Gordon Lam as Albert C.L. Kwong (鄺智立), Senior Superintendent, Waise Lee's faction
 Chin Kar-lok as Vincent W.K. Tsui (徐永基), Senior Superintendent, Sean Lau's faction
 Andy On as Michael Shek, Special Duties Unit commander
 Terence Yin as Man To, Chief Superintendent, Director of Information Systems
 Grace Huang as May Cheung, Probationary Inspector, reporting to Sean Lau & Vincent Tsui
 Aarif Rahman as Billy K.B. Cheung (張國標), ICAC Principal Investigation Officer
 Jeannie Chan as Nicole Chan, ICAC Assistant Investigator
 Eddie Peng as Joe K.C. Lee (李家俊), Police Constable on EU 71, Waise Lee's only child
 Ma Yili as Sean Lau's wife
 J.J. Jia as Vincent W.K. Tsui's wife
 Alex Tsui Ka-kit as Matthew K.M. Mak, Commissioner of ICAC
 Michael Wong as York H.W. Tsang, Commissioner of Police
 Tony Ho Wah-chiu as William Ngai, Chief Superintendent, Kowloon Bay New Treasury Building
 Joyce Cheng as M.Y. Shum, Sergeant, duty commander on EU 71
 Wai Kar-hung as Keung Wong, Police Constable, driver on EU 71
 Eric Li as T.M. Leung, Police Constable, communications on EU 71
 Gary Chan as K.F. Cheng, Police Constable on EU 71
 Byron Mann as Chan Bun, Lead Hijacker.

Production
Production took place in Hong Kong from October to December 2011.

Awards and nominations

Sequel
A sequel, titled Cold War 2, began production in September 2015, with original cast members Aaron Kwok, Tony Leung Ka-fai, Charlie Young, Aarif Rahman and Eddie Peng, and joined by new cast members Chow Yun-fat and Janice Man. Cold War 2 was released on 8 July 2016.

References

External links
 
 
 Cold War: HKAFF Film Review
 Cold War: Busan Film Review
 寒戰 - Yahoo!電影

2012 films
Hong Kong crime thriller films
Hong Kong action thriller films
2012 action thriller films
2012 crime thriller films
Police detective films
2010s Cantonese-language films
Best Film HKFA
Films set in Hong Kong
Films shot in Hong Kong
Films directed by Longman Leung
Films directed by Sunny Luk
2010s Hong Kong films